The 2014 Supercoppa Italiana was the 27th edition of the Supercoppa Italiana, Italian football supercup, played on 22 December 2014 at the Jassim bin Hamad Stadium in Doha, Qatar. It was held between 2013–14 Serie A champions, Juventus, and the winners of the 2013–14 Coppa Italia, Napoli. Juventus were the defending champions. The game was tentatively scheduled to be played on 24 August 2014, but due to Napoli's participation in the 2014–15 UEFA Champions League play-off round, the team asked that the game be rescheduled during Serie A's winter break. Napoli emerged as the victorious side 6–5 in a penalty shootout, following a 2–2 draw, to pick up their second trophy in the tournament. Qatar became the fifth different country to host a Supercoppa Italiana.

Background
Juventus was making a record 10th appearance, and seeking a record seventh cup. They had won the last two editions of the Supercoppa, with an overall record of six wins and three defeats, then a joint record with Milan. Both of Napoli's prior appearances had been against Juventus, beating them 5–1 in 1990 but losing 2–4 after extra time in 2012.

Match
Carlos Tevez put Juventus ahead in the fifth minute following defensive errors by Napoli. Marek Hamšík and Gonzalo Higuaín both struck the post, but the latter equalised with a header in the second half, and the game went into extra time.

Tevez again gave his team the lead in the second half of extra time, but with three minutes remaining Higuaín equalised for a second time to force a penalty shootout. Both of the first kicks in the shootout missed: Tevez hit the post and Jorginho had his attempt for Napoli saved by Gianluigi Buffon. With both teams scoring four in the shootout, it went to sudden death, in which both teams had two consecutive misses each: Giorgio Chiellini had his attempt saved and Roberto Pereyra shot high, while Buffon saved attempts from Napoli duo Dries Mertens and José Callejón. Finally, Kalidou Koulibaly netted for Napoli, then their goalkeeper Rafael saved attempt from Simone Padoin to win the trophy.

Details

See also
 Juventus F.C.–S.S.C. Napoli rivalry

References

Juventus F.C. matches
S.S.C. Napoli matches
2014–15 in Italian football cups
2014
Supercoppa Italiana 2014
2014–15 in Qatari football
International association football competitions hosted by Qatar
Sports competitions in Doha
21st century in Doha